Kensington Temple is a Pentecostal Church in the Notting Hill area of London, England. It is pastored by Reverend Mark Ryan, and is the largest church in its denomination, the Elim Pentecostal Church.

History
The present church building was founded as Horbury Chapel, and used by the Hornton Street Congregational church, Notting Hill, in 1849. The building was purchased in 1930 by George Jeffreys. This became the Bible-Pattern Church Fellowship, Elim's flagship church, becoming Kensington Temple, Church of the Foursquare Gospel in 1935.

The use of the building reverted to the Elim Church in the early 1960s, and the church as it is known today was founded in 1965 by the Elim minister Rev. Eldin Corsie. Under his ministry in the late 1960s–1970s the congregation grew to 600, and then to several thousand under Rev. Wynne Lewis (later to become the Elim Church's General Superintendent) during the 1980s.

Since the 1980s, nicknamed by members of the church as 'KT', Kensington Temple has planted 150 churches across London. Today, the wider Kensington Temple London City Church Network includes 26 Network Churches located across Greater London. Over the years, many churches KT has planted have opted to become independent churches or to have an official status as a self-standing Elim church.

In 2000, Kensington Temple began to transition into a cell church, and today it has hundreds of cell groups meeting weekly across London. The same year, KT moved its offices from Tabernacle, an ex-BBC warehouse in North Acton, to Monarch House in North Acton. In 2005, the church moved its offices to Summit House, Hanger Lane, London. Over the years, Kensington Temple has held some of their annual events in large premier venues and conference centres in London including; Royal Albert Hall, Westminster Central Hall, Wembley Conference Centre and Wembley Arena.

In 2020, Kensington Temple has 7,000 members. The church continues to hold services in Notting Hill, as well as running a Bible School, online learning, rooms to let, a bookshop and a publishing company; Dovewell Communications.

Theology and ministry
Kensington Temple's theology is Pentecostal, emphasizing the work of the Holy Spirit in the life of the church and individuals.

The emphasis of ministry at KT is to equip all Christians to follow Jesus Christ and to grow both individually and collectively to be like him. Much of this equipping happens through cells, small groups that gather throughout the city. During the week, cell groups provide pastoral care, support and training for church members.

The overarching mission is London and the World for Christ.

References

External links
Official website

Elim Pentecostal Church
Pentecostal churches in London
Churches in the Royal Borough of Kensington and Chelsea
Buildings and structures in Notting Hill
Evangelical megachurches in the United Kingdom